François Lapointe (born March 26, 1971) is a Canadian politician who served as MP for the electoral district of Montmagny—L'Islet—Kamouraska—Rivière-du-Loup. He was defeated in the 2015 election.

On the night of the 2011 election, Lapointe was initially declared unsuccessful in his riding, losing narrowly to incumbent MP Bernard Généreux. However, Lapointe was subsequently declared elected on May 5, 2011, after the riding's returning officer determined that 100 votes for Lapointe were reportedly allocated in error to the Green Party candidate in the initial tally.

In the updated count, Lapointe won over Généreux by a margin of just five votes. Following an automatic judicial recount, Lapointe's victory was confirmed.

Lapointe ran in a by-election in Montmagny—L'Islet—Kamouraska—Rivière-du-Loup in 2009, but finished a distant fourth. Lapointe was nominated as the Liberal candidate in the riding for the 2021 federal election, but came in third.

Electoral record

Source: Elections Canada, 2011 General Election, Montmagny--L'Islet--Kamouraska--Rivière-du-Loup, Results certified by judicial recount

References

External links

1971 births
New Democratic Party MPs
Members of the House of Commons of Canada from Quebec
French Quebecers
Living people
People from Chaudière-Appalaches
21st-century Canadian politicians